Iriépal is a village (pedanía) belonging to the Spanish municipality of Guadalajara, in the autonomous community of Castilla–La Mancha. The GU-905 road links Iriépal to the city of Guadalajara.

Name 
According to Manuel Fernández Escalante the toponym Iriépal may be connected to the Basque  →  ('city of the valley'), while Javier de Hoz stressed the -pal ending as connected to the Latin  ('swamp').

History 
A former municipality, Iriépal was absorbed by the provincial capital in 1969, together with Valdenoches and Taracena.

References 

Guadalajara, Spain
Populated places in the Province of Guadalajara